SMS Balaton was one of six s built for the  (Austro-Hungarian Navy) shortly before the First World War. Completed in 1913, she did not participate in the attacks on the Italian mainland after Italy declared war on Austria-Hungary in May 1915. Two months later the ship bombarded a small island in the Central Adriatic Sea during an unsuccessful attempt to recapture it from the Italians. In November and early December Balaton was one of the ships conducting raids off the Albanian coast to interdict the supply lines between Italy and Albania. She played a minor role in the 1st Battle of Durazzo in late December. Balaton participated in several unsuccessful raids on the Otranto Barrage in 1917, although she sank an ammunition ship during the Battle of the Strait of Otranto. She was transferred to Italy in 1920 in accordance with the peace treaties ending the war and renamed Zenson. The  (Royal Italian Navy) used her for spare parts; she was discarded in 1923 and subsequently scrapped.

Design and description

The Tátra-class destroyers were faster, more powerfully armed and more than twice as large as the preceding . The ships had a complement of 105 officers and enlisted men.

The Tátras were powered by two AEG-Curtiss steam turbine sets, each driving a single propeller shaft using steam provided by six Yarrow boilers. Four of the boilers were oil-fired while the remaining pair used coal.

The main armament of the Tátra-class destroyers consisted of two 50-caliber Škoda Works  K10 guns, one each fore and aft of the superstructure in single mounts. Their secondary armament consisted of six 45-caliber  guns, two of which were on anti-aircraft mountings. They were also equipped with four  torpedo tubes in two twin rotating mountings amidships.

Construction and career
Balaton was laid down by Ganz-Danubius at their shipyard in Porto Ré in the Kingdom of Croatia-Slavonia of the Austro-Hungarian Empire on 6 November 1911, launched on 16 November 1912 and completed on 3 November 1913. The Tátra-class ships did not play a significant role in the minor raids and skirmishing in the Adriatic in 1914 and early 1915 between the Entente Cordiale and the Central Powers. On 13 August 1914, Balaton helped to rescue survivors from the Austro-Hungarian passenger ship  after it had blundered into a minefield and sunk.

On 28 July, all six Tátra-class ships and the same pair of cruisers, reinforced by the German submarine , attempted to recapture Pelagosa. Despite a heavy bombardment by the ships, the 108-man landing party was unable to overcome the 90-man garrison and was forced to withdraw.

The Bulgarian declaration of war on Serbia on 14 October cut the existing supply line from Serbia to Salonika, Greece, and forced the Allies to begin supplying Serbia through ports in Albania. This took about a month to work out the details and the Austro-Hungarians took just about as long to decide on a response. Admiral Anton Haus, commander of the Austro-Hungarian Navy, ordered  (Captain) Heinrich Seitz, Helgolands commander, to take his ship, Saida and all six Tátra-class destroyers on a reconnaissance mission off the Albanian coast on the night of 22/23 November. They encountered and sank a small cargo ship and a motor schooner carrying flour for Serbia; four Italian destroyers were unable to intercept them before they reached friendly territory. On 6 December, Helgoland and the Tátras swept down the coast to Durazzo, sinking five motor schooners, including two in Durazzo harbor.

1st Battle of Durazzo

If they were not found he was to arrive at Durazzo at dawn and destroy any ships found there. He was unable to find the destroyers and dutifully arrived off Durazzo at dawn. At 07:30 he ordered four of his destroyers into the harbor to sink the cargo ship and two schooners anchored there while Helgoland engaged the coastal artillery defending the port and Balaton patrolled the seaward flank. A well-camouflaged  artillery battery opened fire at 08:00 at point-blank range. While maneuvering to avoid its fire, Lika and Triglav entered a minefield. After striking two mines in quick succession, Lika sank at 08:03 and Triglav was crippled when her boiler rooms flooded after hitting one mine.Tátra was finally successful in securing a tow on Triglav at 09:30, but was limited to a speed of  when Seitz led his ships northwards. He radioed for assistance at 10:35 and was informed an hour later that the armored cruiser  and four torpedo boats were en route to support him.

Italian observers had spotted Seitz's ships at 07:00 and the Allied quick-reaction force of the British light cruiser  and the Italian scout cruiser , escorted by five French destroyers, sortied in an attempt to cut off the Austro-Hungarian ships from their base at Cattaro. These were followed two hours later by the Italian scout cruiser , the British light cruiser  and four Italian destroyers. Seitz had ordered Triglavs crew taken off before any of the columns of smoke from these ships were spotted by his ships and he ordered Tátra to drop her tow at 13:15 and abandon Triglav. Five minutes later the Austro-Hungarian ships were spotted and the French destroyers were ordered to deal with Triglav at 13:38 while the cruisers pursued Seitz's ships.

 
The destroyers were generally not engaged during this battle, being further away, although Csepel was hit once with little effect. Despite further hits on the cruiser which reduced her speed to  the Austro-Hungarians were able to disengage before reaching the Italian coast when darkness fell around 17:30 and they reached Šibenik safely.

Balaton was refitting in Pola from 1 January to 11 February 1916. On the night of 31 May/1 June, Balaton and her sister , together with three torpedo boats, attacked the Otranto Barrage and sank one of the drifters maintaining it with a torpedo. On 4 July Helgoland, Balaton, Orjen and Tátra raided the barrage, but could not find any targets in the poor visibility. Helgoland and Novara, escorted by Balaton and Orjen, comprised one of two bombardment groups that Haus planned to bombard the Italian coast on 29 August to provoke a reaction by Allied ships that would be ambushed by waiting U-boats. The weather did not cooperate and it was too foggy to see the coast and all the ships involved returned to harbor without incident. On the night of 11/12 March 1917, Balaton, Orjen, Csepel and Tátra swept through the Strait of Otranto, but failed to sink the French cargo ship  that they encountered.

Battle of the Strait of Otranto

On the night of 14/15 May, Balaton and Csepel departed Cattaro with orders to search off the Albanian coast and the Strait of Otranto for Allied shipping. They were intended to act as a diversion for the attack by the three  scout cruisers on the barrage. Csepel lit up Borea with her searchlight at 03:24 and opened fire immediately afterward, hitting the Italian ship four times in rapid succession. One of the hits broke her main steam pipe which caused her to slow to a stop and the others set her on fire; she sank shortly before dawn.

Italian observers reported this action at 03:48 and the patrolling Italian scout cruiser Carlo Mirabello and her escorting trio of French destroyers were alerted at 04:35 and turned south to intercept. They did not spot the Austro-Hungarian ships, but another group of Allied ships did at 07:45. This group consisted of two British light cruisers, the brand-new Italian scout cruiser Aquila and four Italian destroyers under the command of Rear Admiral Alfredo Acton. He ordered Aquila and the destroyers to investigate five minutes later as the Austro-Hungarian ships turned away towards Durazzo. The scout cruiser was the fastest ship in the Italian fleet and she opened fire at 08:15 at a range of  while closing the range to  before Csepel hit her once at 08:32; severing her main steam line and causing her to lose power. The destroyers continued the pursuit, but broke off when shells from Durazzo's coastal artillery began dropping around them around 09:05. After the Italian ships were moving to rejoin Acton's force at 09:18, Balaton and Csepel turned towards Cattaro, evading an attack by the  en route. During the battle, Balaton fired 85 rounds from her main guns, 60 shells from her secondary armament and two torpedoes.

Helgoland and all of the Tátras attempted to duplicate the success of the earlier raid on 18–19 October, but they were spotted by Italian aircraft and turned back in the face of substantial Allied reinforcements alerted by the aircraft. On the night of 13 December, Balaton, Tátra and Csepel raided the Otranto Barrage, but disengaged after firing torpedoes at what they believed to be four Allied destroyers, although there is no record of any attacks that night in Allied records.

The smaller ships in the Austro-Hungarian Navy were the most active ones and their crews had the highest morale; most of the larger ships did little but swing on their moorings which did nothing to improve the morale of their crews. On 1 February, the Cattaro Mutiny broke out, starting aboard the armored cruiser . The mutineers rapidly gained control of the armored cruiser  and most of the other major warships in the harbor. Unhappy with the failure of the smaller ships' crews to join the mutiny, the mutineers threatened to fire at any ship that failed to hoist a red flag. Balatons crew hoisted a flag with the permission of her captain with the proviso that there should be no disturbances aboard ship. The following day, many of the mutinous ships abandoned the effort after coast-defense guns loyal to the government opened fire on the rebel guard ship . The scout cruisers and Balaton, among other ships, took advantage of the confusion to rejoin loyalist forces in the inner harbor they were protected by coastal artillery. The next morning, the s arrived from Pola and put down the uprising.

On the night of 1/2 July, Balaton, the destroyer  and two torpedo boats were at sea to support an air raid on Venice. They were spotted by a group of seven Italian destroyers south of Caorle and they fought a brief battle with the Italians before disengaging. Both Balaton and Csikós were hit once during the engagement. Balaton began a refit at Pola on 12 September.

End of the war
By October it had become clear that Austria-Hungary was facing defeat in the war. With various attempts to quell nationalist sentiments failing, Emperor Karl I decided to sever Austria-Hungary's alliance with Germany and appeal to the Allies in an attempt to preserve the empire from complete collapse. On 26 October Austria-Hungary informed Germany that their alliance was over. At the same time, the Austro-Hungarian Navy was in the process of tearing itself apart along ethnic and nationalist lines. Vice Admiral Miklós Horthy was informed on the morning of 28 October that an armistice was imminent, and used this news to maintain order and prevent a mutiny among the fleet. While a mutiny was spared, tensions remained high and morale was at an all-time low.

The following day the National Council in Zagreb announced Croatia's dynastic ties to Hungary had come to an end. This new provisional government, while throwing off Hungarian rule, had not yet declared independence from Austria-Hungary. Thus Emperor Karl I's government in Vienna asked the newly formed State of Slovenes, Croats and Serbs for help maintaining the fleet stationed at Pola and keeping order among the navy. The National Council refused to assist unless the Austro-Hungarian Navy was first placed under its command. Emperor Karl I, still attempting to save the Empire from collapse, agreed to the transfer, provided that the other "nations" which made up Austria-Hungary would be able to claim their fair share of the value of the fleet at a later time. All sailors not of Slovene, Croatian, Bosnian, or Serbian background were placed on leave for the time being, while the officers were given the choice of joining the new navy or retiring.

The Austro-Hungarian government thus decided to hand over the bulk of its fleet, preferring to do that rather than give the fleet to the Allies, as the new state had declared its neutrality. Furthermore, the newly formed state had also not yet publicly dethroned Emperor Karl I, keeping the possibility of reforming the Empire into a triple monarchy alive.

Post-war
On 3 November the Austro-Hungarian government signed the Armistice of Villa Giusti with Italy, ending the fighting along the Italian Front, although it refused to recognize the transfer of Austria-Hungary's warships. As a result, on 4 November, Italian ships sailed into the ports of Trieste, Pola, and Fiume and Italian troops occupied the naval installations at Pola the following day. The National Council did not order any men to resist the Italians, but they also condemned Italy's actions as illegitimate. On 9 November, all remaining ships in Pola harbour had the Italian flag raised. At a conference at Corfu, the Allies agreed the transfer could not be accepted, despite sympathy from the United Kingdom. Faced with the prospect of being given an ultimatum to surrender the former Austro-Hungarian warships, the National Council agreed to hand over the ships beginning on 10 November. When the Allies divided up the Austro-Hungarian Fleet amongst its members in January 1920, Balaton was awarded to Italy. She was commissioned in the Regia Marina with the name Zenson on 27 September, but was discarded and subsequently scrapped on 5 July 1923 after having been cannibalized to provide spare parts for her sisters.

Notes

Citations

Bibliography 
 

 
 
 

Tátra-class destroyers
1912 ships